Wang Jiexin is a Chinese swimmer. She won a bronze medal at the 2016 Paralympic Games.  She competes in the Paralympic class S9. She also placed 4th in the Women's 100 backstroke S9 in Rio. In 2020, she was ranked in the top 10 in the world in multiple events in the S9 classification.

References

Paralympic swimmers of China
Swimmers at the 2016 Summer Paralympics
Paralympic bronze medalists for China
Living people
Medalists at the 2016 Summer Paralympics
Year of birth missing (living people)
Chinese female freestyle swimmers
S9-classified Paralympic swimmers